DreamWorks Dragons: The Nine Realms is an American computer animated television series in the How to Train Your Dragon franchise produced by the DreamWorks Animation under DreamWorks Animation Television for Peacock and Hulu.

The series was released on both Peacock and Hulu on December 23, 2021, while season two was released on May 5, 2022. The third season was released on August 18, 2022, while the fourth season was released on November 17, 2022. The fifth season was released on March 2, 2023.

Premise
The series is set in the modern world, 1,300 years after the events of How to Train Your Dragon: The Hidden World (2019). It follows a group of misfit kids, brought by their parents to a huge fissure caused by a comet, who uncover the truth about dragons and where they've been hiding.

Characters and cast

Main
 Jeremy Shada as Thomas "Tom" Kullersen, an adventurous and kindhearted fourteen-year-old who, like his mother, is a descendant of Chief Hiccup Horrendous Haddock III and Astrid, and their two children.
 Ashley Liao as Jun Wong, Eugene and Jun's Asian mother who dons red glasses and is quite short. 
 Marcus Scribner as D'Angelo Baker
 Aimee Garcia as Alexandra "Alex" Gonzalez who befriends Feathers. 
 Vincent Tong as Eugene Wong, Jun's cocky elder brother who is reluctantly accepted into the Dragon Club.

Recurring and Supporting
 Julia Stiles as Olivia Kullersen who is a scientist who works for the Icarus Project. Like her young son, she is descended from Hiccup and Astrid. She finally discovers her son's secret in the fourth season finale "The Night Lights, Part 2" and becomes an ally to the dozens of surviving dragons of the nine reams throughout the Hidden World since the fifth season. 
 Lauren Tom as May Wong, Eugene and Jun's mother who is quite petite and dons a furry hat and red glasses. Like Olivia, she works for the Icarus Project. 
 Keston John as Philip Baker
 Pavar Snipe as Angela Baker
 Justina Machado as Carla Gonzalez, the biological mother of Alexandra who works alongside her wife as a scientist of the Icarus Project.
 Angelique Cabral as Hazel Gonzalez, the "stepmother" of Alexandra and Carla's wife.
 D'Arcy Carden as Linda
 Carrie Keranen as Wilma Sledkin, a cocky and devious scientist of the Icarus Project who is determined to uncover the existence of dragons to the modern world.
 Haley Joel Osment as Leonard Burne/Buzzsaw
 Al Rodrigo as Ford
 Christian Lanz as Winston
 Mark Mercado as Dood

Episodes

Season 1 (2021)

Season 2 (2022)

Season 3 (2022)

Season 4 (2022)

Season 5 (2023)

Production
DreamWorks announced Dragons: The Nine Realms on October 13, 2021. The series was released on Peacock and Hulu on December 23, 2021, with season one containing six episodes for 22 minutes each. The series stars Jeremy Shada. It was produced by showrunners John Tellegen, Chuck Austen and Henry Gilroy.

Broadcast 
Outside the United States, it aired on DreamWorks Channel Asia in 2022. The series will premiere on YTV in Canada, CBBC in United Kingdom, Rai Gulp in Italy, Clan in Spain, Super RTL in Germany and e.tv in South Africa in 2022. It has since also aired in the UK on CBBC.

Video game
In May 2022, DreamWorks Animation and Universal announced that a game based on the series is in the works titled Dragons: Legend of the Nine Realms, published by Outright Games and developed by Aheartfulofgames, making this their second DreamWorks game since Spirit: Lucky Big Adventure. The game tells an original story before from the series and players get to play as Thunder, Tom's dragon, trying to find his family in the hidden world. The game was released on September 23, 2022 with Jeremy Shada reprising his role as Tom, narrating through.

References

External links
 

How to Train Your Dragon
2020s American animated television series
2021 American television series debuts
American children's animated adventure television series
American children's animated comedy television series
American children's animated science fantasy television series
American computer-animated television series
Animated television series about children
Animated television series about dragons
Animated television shows based on films
English-language television shows
Hulu original programming
Hulu children's programming
Peacock (streaming service) original programming
Peacock (streaming service) children's programming
Television series by DreamWorks Animation
Television series by Universal Television